Lyudmyla Kichenok and Xenia Knoll were the defending champions, but chose not to participate.

Sanaz Marand and Melanie Oudin won the title, defeating Robin Anderson and Alison Bai in the final, 6–4, 7–5.

Seeds

Draw

External Links
 Draw

Aegon Surbiton Trophy - Doubles
Aegon Surbiton Trophy